William John Kennedy (1919–2005), better known as Uncle Jack Kennedy, was a lifelong activist for the rights of Australian Aboriginal people, a Wotjobaluk clan elder of the people who spoke the Wergaia language in the Wimmera region of western Victoria, Australia. He was born on 23 March 1919 on the banks of the Wimmera River, not far from the Ebenezer Mission and died on 6 September 2005. He was the great grandson of Dick-a-Dick, a member of the first Australian cricket team to tour England in 1867–68.

He served with the Australian Army in the Syrian Campaign and North Africa and later in the Pacific during World War II, and was awarded the Australian Service Medal and the English Defence Medal for this service.

In 2003 he was named Male Elder of the Year at the National Aborigines' Day Observance Committee (NAIDOC) Week Awards.

In the historic determination of native title in the Wimmera handed down on 13 December 2005, just 3 months after Kennedy's death, Justice Ron Merkel said of Kennedy, as reported by The Age newspaper:

In his reasons for judgement Merkel directly quoted Kennedy twice:

and

References

External links
Uncle Jack Kennedy - Voices of Ebenezer - Mission Voices - Koorie Heritage Trust on the Australian Broadcasting Corporation website
Wotjobaluk man as told by William John Kennedy Snr, Interview by Tracey Rigney, Eureka Street, 8 July 2006

1919 births
2005 deaths
People from Victoria (Australia)
Australian indigenous rights activists
Wergaia
Australian military personnel of World War II